Aldebert de Chambrun may refer to:

 Aldebert de Chambrun (1821–1899), French politician
 Aldebert de Chambrun (1872–1962), French general

See also
 Aldebert (disambiguation)